Auguste Mestral (1812–1884), also known as O. Mestral, was a French photographer. He travelled with fellow photographers Édouard Baldus, Henri Le Secq, and Gustave Le Gray in the summer of 1851 to photograph architectural monuments in France at the request of the Commission des Monuments Historiques.

Gallery

References
    

1812 births
1884 deaths
19th-century French photographers